Dorjee Sun (born 1977) is a social entrepreneur based in Singapore. His work for Carbon Conservation was the subject of the international feature documentary The Burning Season in 2008.  He currently serves as director of Who Gives, Carbon Agro, and Carbon Conservation.

Early life

Sun was born to a Chinese father and a Tibetan mother from Darjeeling in Sydney, Australia. He grew up in northern Sydney and attended North Sydney Boys High School. He graduated from a combined Bachelor of Commerce, Bachelor of Law, and a diploma in Asian studies (Mandarin) in 2001 from the University of New South Wales.  During his studies he spent two years on scholarship in Beijing, China, studying Chinese and law at Peking University.

Career

Sun is the founder of a recruitment software company, as well as an award-winning education company that has mentored more than 150,000 students in Sydney and Melbourne. He has served as a University of Melbourne Asialink Asia Australia Leader, Youth Chair of the Ethnic Communities Council at both national and state levels, University Law Society president, and as a member of the Education Technology Advisory Board.

Sun's company, Carbon Conservation, developed the Ulu Masen project in Aceh, Indonesia, in 2008, aiming to develop 3.3 million carbon credits a year.

The Burning Season looks at the problems of deforestation in Indonesia, issues and challenges from the farmer's perspective, the plight of the orangutans, and Sun on his quest to find a business solution.  It follows him as he tries to convince potential investors from eBay, Starbucks, and Merrill Lynch to invest in a carbon trading solution that will help avoid deforestation in Indonesia while at the same time provide a living for locals.

In 2009, the African Rainforest Conservancy named a newly discovered species of blue spotted chameleon from the rainforests of Tanzania after Sun. The species was named Kinyongia dorjeesuni. This unique species, which lives in the Eastern Arc Mountains of Tanzania, is currently consider a nomen nudum, and is pending its formal species description stating those characteristics that are purported to differentiate the taxon.

Time magazine recognised Sun as one of the Heroes of the Environment (2009) for his work as a carbon-trade broker.  In April 2009, he was honoured by the African Rainforest Conservancy for his work.

Carbon Conservation Controversy

After the failure of the 2009 Cop15 UN Climate Summit in Copenhagen  to achieve a market for rainforest carbon credits, the Waxman-Markey Bill under President Obama  also failed to be passed, resulting in a market collapse for the demand of rainforest carbon credits. Sun’s partner in the effort, former Aceh governor Irwandi, became involved in a fight for his political life, which he lost. The new governor went cold causing the project to come to a stop.

In 2011, with no carbon credits generated, Carbon Conservation sold 50% of its shares to the Canadian mining company East Asia Minerals Corporation who aimed to develop inside the protected forest reserve. The Sydney Morning Herald has stated that "Environmentalists have accused Sun of allowing the company to improve its chances of gaining government approval by 'greenwashing' the venture." AsienHaus deemed the Ulu Masen REDD project, Indonesia as a failure.

Virgil Capital

In May 2017, Sun along with Taiyang Zhang and Stefan Qin cofounded Virgil Capital. Sun played an "instrumental role" in the fund raising for Virgil Capital and mentored his cofounder, Qin. Virgil Capital was subsequently determined to be a scam by Qin and Qin pled guilty to stealing US$90 million in investor money.

References

External links 
 Carbon Conservation
 "Bali's Business Bonanza", The Age.
 "Indonesian Proposal: Pay Us Not to Chop Down Our Trees", The Wall Street Journal.
 "Some Questions for Dorjee Sun", REDD Monitor.
 "East Asia Minerals Announces Acquisition of 50% of Carbon Conservation Pty Ltd", Marketwired.

1977 births
Australian chief executives
Australian conservationists
Australian people of Chinese descent
Australian people of Tibetan descent
Economics and climate change
Singaporean LGBT rights activists
Living people
People educated at North Sydney Boys High School
Sustainability advocates